Supervivientes 2010: Perdidos en Nicaragua, was the eleventh season of Survivor to air in Spain, and it was broadcast on Telecinco from May 6, 2010 to July 25, 2010. For the fifth consecutive year Jesus Vazquez acted as the main host, with Eva Gonzalez and Emma Garcia, acting as host of the special late night talk portion of the show. The main twist this season was that the contestants were both famous celebrities and regular citizens. As part of this twist, the "Anonymous", as the regular citizens were called, had to survive a public vote in order to live on the main island with the celebrities. This was the first time that non-celebrities took part in the program since "Aventura en Africa" back in 2005. Ultimately, it was María José Fernández, who won this season over fellow unknowns Deborah Arenas and Javier "Parri" Parrado.

Finishing order

Nominations

External links
http://www.telecinco.es/supervivientes/

Survivor Spain seasons